stylized as asread.  is a Japanese animation studio established in November 2003 by ex-Xebec members.

Television Works

OVA/ONAs

Notes

References

External links
 

 
Japanese companies established in 2003
Mass media companies established in 2003
Japanese animation studios
Animation studios in Tokyo